Daniel Gawthrop may refer to:

Daniel E. Gawthrop, American composer
Daniel Gawthrop (writer), Canadian journalist